Claudius Afolabi Siffre (born 25 June 1945), better known as Labi Siffre (pronounced "Labby SIF-ree"), is a British singer, songwriter and poet. Siffre released six albums between 1970 and 1975, and four between 1988 and 1998. His best known compositions include "It Must Be Love" which reached number 14 on the UK Singles Chart in 1971 (a song later covered by the ska band Madness), "Crying Laughing Loving Lying", and "(Something Inside) So Strong"—an anti-apartheid song inspired by a television documentary in which white soldiers in South Africa were filmed shooting at black civilians in the street—which hit number 4 on the UK chart. The latter song won Siffre the Ivor Novello Award for Best Song Musically and Lyrically from the British Academy of Songwriters, Composers and Authors, and it has been used in Amnesty International campaigns.

His music has been sampled extensively by US rappers such as Eminem, and Jay-Z. Siffre has published essays, the stage and television play Deathwrite and three volumes of poetry: Nigger, Blood on the Page, and Monument. In 2022, his life and work was explored in the BBC series Imagine, under the title, Labi Siffre: This Is My Song.

Early life and education
Claudius Afolabi Siffre was born as the fourth of five children at Queen Charlotte's and Chelsea Hospital in Hammersmith, London to a British mother of mixed Barbadian and Belgian descent and a Nigerian father. Siffre was brought up in Bayswater and Hampstead and educated at a Catholic independent day school, St Benedict's School, in Ealing, West London. Despite his Catholic education, Siffre has stated that he has always been an atheist.

He studied music at the Eric Gilder School of Music in Wardour Street, Soho. Gilder is remembered with gratitude in his poem "education education education". After leaving school, Siffre worked as a taxi driver and a deliveryman before deciding to concentrate on music. He moved to Cannes, France, where he played guitar with various soul musicians and bands, but returned to the UK in the late 1960s.

Musical career
Siffre played jazz guitar at Annie Ross's jazz club in Soho, London in the 1960s as part of a Hammond organ, guitar, drums house band.

He released six albums between 1970 and 1975. In the early 1970s, three of his singles became hits: "It Must Be Love" (No. 14, 1971, and performed the song on the BBC’s Top of the Pops) (later covered by and a No. 4 hit for Madness, for which Siffre himself appeared in the video); "Crying Laughing Loving Lying" (No. 11, 1972); and "Watch Me" (No. 29, 1972). In 1978, Siffre took part in the heats to represent the UK in the Eurovision Song Contest. He performed his own composition "Solid Love", which placed fifth of the twelve songs up for consideration at the A Song for Europe contest. Additionally, he co-wrote the song "We Got It Bad" performed by Bob James, which came tenth.

Siffre came out of self-imposed retirement from music in 1985, when he saw a television film from Apartheid South Africa showing a white soldier shooting at black children. He wrote "(Something Inside) So Strong" (No. 4, 1987) which he also performed on Top of the Pops, and released four more albums between 1988 and 1998.

Multiple parts of Siffre's 1975 track "I Got The..." were sampled in popular hip hop songs in the 1990s, including in the 1999 Eminem single "My Name Is". As a result of the song's newfound fame, it was finally released as a single in 2006. 

Siffre's 1972 track "My Song", the tenth track on his album Crying Laughing Loving Lying, was sampled by rapper Kanye West on the song "I Wonder" on his third album Graduation.

In February 2022, the BBC broadcast Labi Siffre: This Is My Song, as part of the Imagine series, in which Alan Yentob presented a film exploring Siffre's life and work.

Personal life
Siffre met his partner Peter Lloyd in July 1964 and they were together for 48 years. They entered into a civil partnership in 2005, as soon as it was legally possible in the UK. From the mid-1990s until Lloyd's death in 2013 he and Siffre lived in a ménage à trois with Rudolf van Baardwijk in Crickhowell, South Wales. Van Baardwijk died in 2015. Siffre now lives in Spain.

In 2014, Siffre appeared on the BBC Radio 4 series Great Lives, championing the life of British author Arthur Ransome. Siffre said that Ransome's Swallows and Amazons books had taught him responsibility for his own actions and also a morality that has influenced and shaped him throughout his life.

Discography

Studio albums

Live albums
The Last Songs (Re-mastered) (2006)

Compilation albums
 The Best of Labi Siffre (1995)
 It Must Be Love (The Best of Labi Siffre) (2016)
 Gold (2019)

Singles

Notes

Notable cover versions of Siffre's songs
 "It Must Be Love" was covered by Madness in 1981. The song reached Number 4 in the UK chart and Number 33 in the U.S. in 1983. Labi Siffre also made a cameo appearance in the music video.
 "(Something Inside) So Strong" was covered by singer Michael Ball in 1996, reaching Number 40 in the UK. Rik Waller also covered the song while a contestant on Pop Idol, hitting number 25 in the UK Singles Chart in 2002.

Bibliography
PoetryNigger (Xavier Books 1993)Blood on the Page (Xavier Books 1995)Monument (Xavier Books 1997)

PlaysDeathWrite (Xavier Books 1997)

EssaysChoosing the Stick They Beat You With'' (Penguin 2000)

References

External links
 
 Something Inside So Strong, Soul Music, BBC Radio 4
 Arthur Ransome, Great Lives, BBC Radio 4

1945 births
Bell Records artists
20th-century Black British male singers
English atheists
English male poets
English people of Barbadian descent
English people of Belgian descent
English people of Nigerian descent
English male songwriters
English soul singers
English gay musicians
LGBT Black British people
English LGBT singers
English LGBT songwriters
Living people
People educated at St Benedict's School, Ealing
People from Hammersmith
Pye Records artists
Singers from London
20th-century English LGBT people
21st-century English LGBT people
Gay songwriters
Gay singers